The Mechanical Fabric Company is a historic factory complex on Cromwell and Sprague Streets in the West End neighborhood of Providence, Rhode Island.

Description
The complex consists of six brick buildings, arranged in roughly parallel rows in a city block bounded by Cromwell, Sprague, and Dexter Streets, and Elmwood Avenue.  They were built between 1891 and about 1925.  The Mechanical Fabric Company was a major player in the city's rubber industry, and was particularly notable as the site of innovations in the development and manufacture of pneumatic bicycle tires.

The complex was listed on the National Register of Historic Places in 2014.

Renovations
The former mill space was renovated to include several businesses. The larger building at 55 Cromwell Street has been rebranded as "Rooms & Works." It was briefly home to a food incubator, and in 2019 a local gourmet doughnut company moved in with a 5,000 square foot commercial kitchen. Also in 2019, the former mill building at 40R Sprague Street welcomed a two-level, 3,500-square-foot bar and brewery.

See also
National Register of Historic Places listings in Providence, Rhode Island

References

See also
National Register of Historic Places listings in Providence, Rhode Island

Industrial buildings and structures on the National Register of Historic Places in Rhode Island
Buildings and structures in Providence, Rhode Island
National Register of Historic Places in Providence, Rhode Island
Industrial buildings completed in 1891
1891 establishments in Rhode Island